Donald Rutherford may refer to:

Don Rutherford (1937–2016), English international rugby union player
Donald L. Rutherford (born 1955), U.S. Army General and Roman Catholic priest, and former Chief Chaplain of the U.S. Army
Donald Rutherford (economist) (born 1942), British economist
Donald Rutherford (philosopher) (born 1957), American philosopher